Centennial Summer is a 1946 American musical film directed by Otto Preminger. Starring Jeanne Crain and Cornel Wilde, the film is based on a novel by Albert E. Idell.

It was produced in response to the hugely successful 1944 MGM musical film Meet Me in St. Louis.

Plot
The movie is about two sisters growing up in Philadelphia in the 1870s. They both fall for a Frenchman who has to prepare the pavilion for the Centennial Exposition.

Cast

Awards
The movie was nominated twice at the 19th Academy Awards. One of those nominations was for Best Original Song for the song All Through the Day, written by Jerome Kern and Oscar Hammerstein II. In Kern's case, the nomination was posthumous, as he had died on 11 November 1945.

Songs
"The Right Romance"
"Up with the Lark"
"All Through the Day"
"In Love in Vain"
"Cinderella Sue"
"Two Hearts Are Better Than One" was cut from the film.

References

External links

1946 films
Films directed by Otto Preminger
Films scored by Alfred Newman
Films set in 1876
American musical films
20th Century Fox films
1946 musical films
Films based on American novels
1940s English-language films
1940s American films